The WCWA World Tag Team Championship was the primary professional wrestling tag team championship promoted by the Dallas–Fort Worth metroplex area–based World Class Wrestling Association (WCWA). The championship was originally introduced as the NWA United States Tag Team Championship in 1967, when the promotion was known as NWA Big Time Wrestling. It was later renamed the NWA American Tag Team Championship in 1969. In 1982 Big Time Wrestling, changed their name to World Class Championship Wrestling and the title became the WCCW American Tag Team Championship. In 1987 WCCW became World Class Wrestling Association and the championship was rebranded as the WCWA World Tag Team Championship. In 1989 the title was won by Cactus Jack and Scott Braddock, where it was transformed into the USWA World Tag Team Championship. As it is a professional wrestling championship, it is won not by actual competition, but by a scripted ending to a match. The WCWA Texas Tag Team Championship served as the secondary tag team championship in the promotion from 1950 to 1989.

The first confirmed NWA United States Tag Team Champions was The Internationals, the team of Al Costello and Kurt Von Brauner), with their first confirmed title defense took place in January 1967. The Dynamic Duo (Gino Hernandez and Chris Adams) were the last team to hold the WCCW American Tag Team Championship. When WCCW withdrew from the NWA and was renamed WCWA, the promotion decided to introduce the WCWA World Tag Team Championship as the promotions top title. Matt Borne and Buzz Sawyer because the first team to hold the WCWA World Tag Team Championship, defeating Chris Adams and Lance Von Erich in the finals of a tournament. Scott Braddock and Cactus Jack were the last team to hold the title as WCWA merged with the Continental Wrestling Association to form the United States Wrestling Association. The Von Erichs (Kerry and Kevin Von Erich holds the record for most reigns, with 5 as a team, while Kerry Von Erich held the championship a total of 10 times with various partners. The longest reign lasted 448 days as Billy Red Lyons and Fritz Von Erich held the championship from January 30, 1968, to April 22, 1969. Mr. Hito and Mr. Sakurada held the championship for one day, the shortest of all championship reigns.

Title history

WCCW American Tag Team Championship Tournament (1986)
The main event of the Labor Day Star Wars show was a tag team tournament for the vacant WCCW Tag Team Championship. The title had been vacated by the promotion due to the break up of previous champions Chris Adams and Gino Hernandez earlier that year.

See also

List of National Wrestling Alliance championships
National Wrestling Alliance
World Class Championship Wrestling
United States Wrestling Association
USWA Tag Team Championship

Footnotes

References

National Wrestling Alliance championships
Tag team wrestling championships
World Class Championship Wrestling championships